It is the 2021–22 season of the Men's Volleyball team of Galatasaray Sports Club.

Sponsorship and kit manufacturers

Supplier: Galatasaray Store
Name sponsor: HDI Sigorta
Main sponsor: HDI Sigorta
Back sponsor: —

Sleeve sponsor: —
Lateral sponsor: —
Short sponsor: A11 Hotels
Socks sponsor: —

Technical Staff

Team roster

Transfers

New contracts

In

Out

Pre-season and friendlies

|}

Competitions

Turkish Men's Volleyball League (AXA Sigorta Efeler Ligi)

League table

Regular season (1st Half)
All times are Europe Time (UTC+03:00).																						

|}

Regular season (2nd Half)
All times are Europe Time (UTC+03:00).																						

|}

Playoffs

5–8th place
All times are Europe Time (UTC+03:00).																						

|}

5–6th place
All times are Europe Time (UTC+03:00).																						

|}

Turkish Men's Volleyball Cup (AXA Sigorta Kupa Voley)

Group A

|}

Results
All times are Europe Time (UTC+03:00).																						

|}

Quarter-finals
All times are Europe Time (UTC+03:00).																						

|}

Semi-finals
All times are Europe Time (UTC+03:00).																						

|}

Finals
All times are Europe Time (UTC+03:00).																						

|}

CEV Cup

16th Finals

|}

8th Finals

|}

References

External links
 Official Galatasaray Volleyball Branch Website 
 Galatasaray Istanbul » rosters __ Volleybox 
 Turkish Volleyball Federastion Official Website 

Galatasaray S.K. (men's volleyball) seasons
Galatasaray Sports Club 2021–22 season